Café de olla (lit. pot coffee) is a traditional Mexican coffee beverage.  To prepare café de olla, it is essential to use a traditional earthen clay pot, as this gives a special flavor to the coffee.  This type of coffee is principally consumed in cold climates and in rural areas.

In Mexico, a basic café de olla is made with ground coffee, cinnamon, and piloncillo. Optional ingredients include orange peel, anise, and cloves.

See also
 
 
 List of hot beverages
 Mexican cuisine

References

Coffee drinks
Hot drinks
Mexican drinks